The Dodger ("the Rascal") is a 1971 Greek film directed and written by Giannis Dalianidis  and starring Chronis Exarhakos, Nora Valsami, Giannis Mihalopoulos, Spyros Kalogirou and Katerina Gioulaki.  The movie is based on the play Parti gia neous (Πάρτι για νέους) or Youth Party by Nikos Tsiforos. It was the last film by Finos Film to be made in black and white and the only that starred Chronis Exarhakos. The movie sold 157,614 tickets in its run.

Cast
Chronis Exarhakos ..... Chronis Varnis
Nora Valsami ..... Eva Varni
Giannis Mihalopoulos ..... Miltos Kladaras
Spyros Kalogirou ..... Ploutarhos Varnis
Katerina Gioulaki ..... Toula Varni
Nasos Kedrakas ...... Thrasyvoulos Traganopoulos
Vasilis Tsivilikas ..... Mihalis Psarelis
Kaiti Imbrohori ..... Litsa

External links

1971 films
Greek comedy films
Greek films based on plays
1970s Greek-language films
Finos Film films
Films directed by Giannis Dalianidis